Thurstonella is a monotypic genus of crustaceans belonging to the monotypic family Thurstonellidae. The only species is Thurstonella chelata.

The species is found in Antarctica.

References

Amphipoda
Monotypic crustacean genera